Origo Sound is a Norwegian independent record label formed in 1990 in Norway by Harald Lervik. The initiative to start the label was taken after Tormod Opedal, an employee in Lervik's software company, in 1989 had decided to close his own label Cicada which had released two albums by the Norwegian composer Erik Wøllo. Wøllo had a new album ready to be released, and Origo Sound was formed the year after, with two albums launched in the autumn 1990, of which one was the new Wøllo album

Origo Sound's major successes were the two albums by Biosphere, Microgravity and Patashnik. Hailed by Norwegian and international press for setting the standard for what was to become known as ambient techno, the albums were followed by two more albums on the label, Substrata and the movie soundtrack Insomnia.

Up until 2007, all but one of the albums released were by Norwegian bands and artists. The one exception was the Finnish duo Dystopia's album The Second Dawn in 1998, but Harald Lervik says this was purely coincidental. In 2010, the label released its first CD of original music since 2004.

Over the years, Origo Sound has released albums in a variety of styles, all founded in various electronic music subgenres. The first few years were dominated by a mix of styles ranging from new-age music to ethnic and techno. The mid 1990s saw some techno influenced albums, while in the recent past the label has moved in the direction of ambient and experimental music. The melodic approach is also covered in the catalogue.

In 2007, Origo Sound was merged into Planet Origo, an Estonian company owned by Norwegian investors, including Harald Lervik. In October that year, the label released its first CD since 2004, the sampler Planet Origo, as a warm-up to future releases. In 2013, Origo Sound was re-established as an independent, Norwegian record label.

Discography
This list is organized by release year. Titles are full length albums unless otherwise mentioned.

See also
 Electronic music
 Progressive electronic music
 Computer music
 Dance music
 Electronic art music
 Ishkur's Guide to Electronic Music
 Synthesizer
 Electronic dance music

References

External links
 Official website
 Interview with founder Harald Lervik
 Erik Wøllo official website
 Biosphere official website
 Living Dreamtime official website
 Karsten Brustad biography at mic.no
 Green Isac official website
 Circular official website
 Current official website
 Sverre Knut Johansen official website

Electronic music record labels
Norwegian independent record labels
Ambient music record labels
Record labels established in 1990
Alternative rock record labels